Catenisphaera is a genus from the family of Erysipelotrichidae with one known species (Catenisphaera adipataccumulans). Catenisphaera adipataccumulans has been isolated from an anaerobic digester from Fukagawa in Japan

See also
 List of bacterial orders
 List of bacteria genera

References

Erysipelotrichia
Bacteria genera
Monotypic bacteria genera